Abax carinatus is a species of ground beetle native to Europe and the Near East. In Europe, it is found in Albania, Austria, Belgium, Bosnia and Herzegovina, Bulgaria, Croatia, the Czech Republic, mainland France, Germany, Hungary, mainland Italy, Luxembourg, Moldova, Poland, Romania, southern Russia, Slovakia, Slovenia, Switzerland, the Netherlands, Ukraine and Yugoslavia.

External links

Abax carinatus at Fauna Europaea

Pterostichinae
Beetles described in 1812